Doue may refer to:

People with the surname
 Joseph Foullon de Doué (1715–1789), French politician
 Marc Olivier Doue (born 2000), French football player
 Noumandiez Doué (born 1970), Côte d'Ivoire football referee
 Peabo Doue (born 1991), American football player
 Toussaint Bertin de la Doué (1680–1743), French composer

Places
 Doue, Seine-et-Marne, France
 Doué River, Senegal
 Doué-en-Anjou, France
 Doué-la-Fontaine, France

See also
 Doues, Aosta Valley, Italy